The SS Cape Mohican (T-AKR-5065) is a steam turbine powered heavy-lift SEABEE barge carrier, one of two ships of her type in the Military Sealift Command's Ready Reserve Force.

Cape Mohican was activated for service during Desert Storm, and has performed various transportation duties over the years. She was berthed at Port of Oakland, California as part of the National Defense Reserve Fleet (NDRF). Regular maintenance and sea trials kept her ready to activate on five days' notice.

The Cape Mohican was the source of a 1996 spill of 40,000 gallons of heavy fuel oil in San Francisco Bay causing $3.625 million in natural resources damages.

On July 9, 2021, the Cape  Mohican was towed by a seagoing tug boat out of San Francisco Bay, on its way via the Panama Canal to Texas, where it will be broken down and recycled.

Construction and commissioning
She was originally built as the Maritime Administration type (C8-S-82a) hull SS Tillie Lykes, ON 536672, IMO 7223314, under MARAD contract (MA hull 243), for commercial use with the Lykes Brothers Steamship Company. She was laid down on 15 July 1971 at the General Dynamics Shipyard in Quincy, Massachusetts, hull no. 20. She was launched on 23 September 1972, and delivered for service on 16 March 1973. The ship was turned over to MARAD on 20 March 1986, and assigned to MSC's RRF as SS Cape Mohican (T-AKR-5065).

The Cape Mohican is one of three ships in the Cape M-class, the other two of which are also named for capes in the United States whose names begin with the letter "M".  It is one of several ships in the history of the U.S. Navy to be named SS Cape Mohican

Oil spill
On October 28, 1996, while the Cape Mohican was in a dry dock just south of the present location of Oracle Park, a worker opened a valve on the ship thinking he was releasing water.  Instead of water, fuel oil was released by the valve, and 40,000 gallons of it spilled into San Francisco Bay.  Although the spill was modest even in the local history of the Bay (it was the largest to take place there between 1988 and 2007), it still polluted 120 miles of shoreline and killed at least hundreds of birds.  In 1998, the Maritime Administration and San Francisco Dry Dock Inc. paid a court settlement of $8 million, which was split roughly evenly between a fund for environmental restoration and reimbursement to agencies involved in the cleanup.

Grounding
On May 21, 2001, the Cape Mohican was participating in an exercise at Chilpo Beach, just north of Pohang, South Korea. While in the harbor, heavy winds caused her to drag anchor approximately 150 feet and run aground on rocks, causing damage to her hull and internal tanks. This damage required salvage work and emergency dry-docking along with 1500 tons of steel to make her seaworthy again

See also
SS Cape May (T-AKR-5063) sister ship

References

Factsheet on the website of the MSC
NavSource Online Service Ship Photo Archive: Mohican
Maritime Administration Record Detail: Mohican

 

Type C8 ships
Ships built in Quincy, Massachusetts
1972 ships
Cape M-class heavy lift ships
Auxiliary ships of the United States